Beryllium nitrate is an inorganic compound with the idealized chemical formula Be(NO3)2.  The formula suggests a salt, but, as for many beryllium compounds,  the compound is highly covalent.  Little of its chemistry is well known.  "When added to water, brown fumes are evolved; when hydrolyzed in sodium hydroxide solution, both nitrate and nitrite ions are produced."

Synthesis and reactions
The straw-colored adduct Be(NO3)2(N2O4) forms upon treatment of beryllium chloride with dinitrogen tetroxide:
BeCl2  +  3N2O4  →  Be(NO3)2(N2O4)  +  2NOCl
Upon heating, this adduct loses N2O4 and produces colorless Be(NO3)2.  Further heating of Be(NO3)2 induces conversion to basic beryllium nitrate, which adopts a structure akin to that for basic berylium acetate.

Unlike the basic acetate, with its six lipophilic methyl groups, the basic nitrate is insoluble in most solvents.

References 

Beryllium compounds
Nitrates